Bapara paynei is a species of snout moth in the genus Bapara. It was described by Whalley in 1964, and is known from New Guinea.

References

Tirathabini
Moths described in 1964